The South West Rugby League (SWRL) also known as the South West Men's League, is a rugby league competition for teams in the South West of England. It was formerly part of the Rugby League Conference.

The SWRL is a semi-autonomous league with a five-member committee under an Rugby Football League (RFL) appointed chairman. The SWRL has five member clubs from Devon and Cornwall.

History

The Rugby League Conference was founded in 1997 as the Southern Conference, a 10-team pilot league for teams in the South of England and the English Midlands.

The conference made the leap from 30 to 52 teams in 2003 and a South West Division appeared for the first time. It disappeared in 2004 as South West teams took part in the Western Division and Cardiff Demons joined the newly created Welsh Division.

The Premier divisions saw a change in boundaries leaving the North Premier division covering a larger area to give the English Midlands clubs their own premier division without having to face heartland teams, this left the West Midlands division with too few teams to run, resulting in a merged West Midlands and South West Division.

After a campaign by the RFL to form new clubs in the South West, a new South West division was created in 2007 for teams from the West Country. By 2010, there were enough teams to have a South West conference split into two pools.

For the 2011 season, there was a new RLC West of England alongside the RLC South West. The initial idea was that the two leagues would compete side by side with play-offs at the end of the season to decide an overall South West champion. In 2011, Gloucestershire Warriors defeated Somerset Vikings in the Championship play-off. In 2012, the intended play-off match was cancelled as the majority of the Devon Sharks team, the South West Champions, were unable to break off from the start of the rugby union season to fulfil the fixture.

The South Western Rugby League was formed in February 2013 to organise and administer the South West Men's League following the switch of the majority of community clubs in England to a summer season and the ending of the Rugby League Conference in 2011.

Rugby League Conference Pyramid

 National Conference League
 Conference League South
 South West League

This is officially the highest tier 4 league that South West clubs can play in.

2019 South West Men's League

South West Cup

The South West cup is a knock-out competition played for by members of the South West Division. It was originally known as the Devon Cup.

2006: East Devon Eagles (as Devon Cup)
2007: East Devon Eagles (as Devon Cup)
2008: Plymouth Titans (as Devon Cup)
2009: East Devon Eagles
2010: Devon Sharks
2011: Plymouth Titans
2012: Exeter Centurions
2013: Cornish Rebels
2014: Cornish Rebels
2015: Exeter Centurions

South West Nines

The South West Nines is a rugby league nines competition. It is competed for by RLC South West and RLC West of England teams and local student rugby league sides.

2007 Plymouth Titans
2008 Exeter University
2009 Exeter University
2010 Exeter University
2011 Exeter University
2012 Plymouth Titans
2013 Exeter University
2014 Cornish Rebels
2015 Cornish Rebels

County Challenge

In 2010, a ″one–off″ match was played between Devon and Cornwall with Devon winning 44–20. The match was featured on the BBC national news and was widely covered by the rugby league press. It is now competed for annually and known as the Martin Roddy MBE Trophy.

2010 Devon
2011 Devon
2012 Cornwall
2013 Cornwall
2015 Devon

South West County Championship Festival
The first South West County Championship took place on the May Bank Holiday weekend in 2011 at Aretians RFC in Bristol. The 2012 Event took place at Bridgwater RFC in Somerset.

2011 Hampshire
2012 Hampshire

Participating teams by season

South West League
2003: Bristol Sonics, Cardiff Demons, Gloucestershire Warriors, Oxford Cavaliers, Somerset Vikings, Worcestershire Saints
2005: Bristol Sonics, Gloucestershire Warriors, Oxford Cavaliers, Plymouth, Somerset Vikings, Thames Valley
2007: Devon Sharks, East Devon Eagles, Exeter Centurions, Plymouth Titans, Somerset Vikings 'A'
2008: Devon Sharks, East Devon Eagles, Exeter Centurions, Plymouth Titans, Somerset Vikings
2009: Devon Sharks, East Devon Eagles, Exeter Centurions, Plymouth Titans, Somerset Vikings, South Dorset Giants
2010: Devon Sharks, East Devon Eagles, Exeter Centurions, North Devon Raiders, Plymouth Titans, Somerset Vikings, South Dorset Giants, South Somerset Warriors
2011: Devon Sharks, East Devon Eagles, Exeter Centurions, North Devon Raiders, Plymouth Titans, Somerset Vikings, South Dorset Giants, (South Somerset Warriors withdrew mid-season)
2012: Devon Sharks, Exeter Centurions, Exmouth Saints (replacements for East Devon Eagles; failed to complete the season), North Devon Raiders, Plymouth Titans
2013: Cornish Rebels, Devon Sharks, Exeter Centurions, North Devon Raiders, Plymouth Titans, Somerset Vikings A
2014: Cornish Rebels, Devon Sharks, Exeter Centurions, North Devon Raiders, Plymouth Titans
2015: Cornish Rebels, Devon Sharks, Exeter Centurions, North Devon Raiders, Plymouth Titans

West of England League
2011: Bristol Sonics 'A', Gloucestershire Warriors, Oxford Cavaliers, Swindon St George, Wiltshire Wyverns
2012: Bristol Sonics 'A', Gloucestershire Warriors 'A', Oxford Cavaliers, Somerset Vikings, Swindon St George (Wiltshire Wyverns failed to start the season)
2013: Bristol Sonics 'A', Cheltenham Old Patesians, Gloucestershire Warriors, Oxford Cavaliers, Somerset Vikings, Swindon St George
2014: Bristol Sonics 'A', Cheltenham Old Patesians, Gloucestershire Warriors, Oxford Cavaliers 'A', Somerset Vikings, Swindon St George (Oxford Cavaliers 'A' failed to complete the season)

Winners

South West League
2003 Cardiff Demons
2005 Gloucestershire Warriors
2007 Plymouth Titans
2008 East Devon Eagles
2009 Devon Sharks
2010 East Devon Eagles
2011 Somerset Vikings
2012 Devon Sharks
2013 Devon Sharks
2014 Cornish Rebels

West of England League
2011 Gloucestershire Warriors
2012 Oxford Cavaliers
2013 Cheltenham Old Patesians
2014 Gloucestershire Warriors
2015 Bath and Wiltshire Romans
2016 Portsmouth Seahawks
2017 Swindon St George

References

External links
 South West rugby league site
 South West Rugby League on facebook

Rugby League Conference
Rugby league in Devon
Rugby league in Somerset
Rugby league in Cornwall
Sports leagues established in 2003
2003 establishments in England